= Lahore Composting Facility =

The Lahore Composting Facility is a composting factory in Lahore, Pakistan, operated by the Danish Carbon Fund (DCF). It is the first large-scale public-private partnership in Pakistan in the area of municipal solid waste (MSW) management.

The facility was set up at Mehmood Booti following an agreement with the City District Government of Lahore (CDGL). The project is expected to generate over 310,000 tons of CO2e by 2018.
